The governor of Querétaro is the chief executive of the Mexican state of Querétaro. According to the Constitution of the Free and Sovereign State of Queretaro, the exercise of executive power of the Mexican state, is deposited in one individual, it called the Constitutional Governor is elected for a period of six years no re-eligible for any reason. The governmental period begins on October 1 of the year of the election and ends on September 30 after six years have elapsed. Queretaro state was created in 1824, one of the original states of the federation, thus throughout its historical life has passed by all systems of governance found in Mexico, both federal system as the central system, so the name of the organization has varied between been and department; changing along with it, the name of the head of the Executive branch of government.

Individuals who have held the governorship of the state of Queretaro, in its various denominations, were as follows:

Governors of the Free and Sovereign State of Querétaro

La Primera República (1823) 

 (1821): Miguel Torres
 (1821): Juan José García Rebollo
 (1821 - 1822): José Joaquín Calvo
 (1825): José Manuel Septién, Juan José Pastor, and Andrés Quintanar

El Triunvirato (1825-1829) 

 (1825): Andrés Quintanar
 (1825 - 1829): José María Diez Marina
 (1829): José Rafael Canalizo
 (1829 - 1830): Ramón Covarrubias
 (1830 - 1832): Manuel López de Ecala
 (1832 - 1833): José Rafael Canalizo
 (1833): José Antonio Mejía

The Santanismo (1833-1857) 

 (1833 - 1834): Lino Ramírez
 (1834 - 1837): José Rafael Canalizo
 (1837 - 1840): Ramón Covarrubias
 (1840): Sabás Antonio Domínguez
 (1840 - 1841): José Francisco Figueroa (governor)
 (1841 - 1842): Sabás Antonio Domínguez
 (1842): José Francisco Figueroa (governor)
 (1842 - 1844): Julián Juvera
 (1844): Sabás Antonio Domínguez
 (1844): Julián Juvera
 (1845): Héctor Flores (governor)
 (1844 - 1846): Sabás Antonio Domínguez
 (1846): Manuel María Lombardini
 (1846): José Antonio del Razo
 (1846 - 1847): Francisco Berdusco
 (1847 - 1849): Francisco de Paula Mesa
 (1859 - 1850): Juan Manuel Fernández de Jaúregui
 (1850 - 1853): José Antonio Urrutia
 (1853): Ramón María Loreto Canal de Samaniego
 (1853): José Guerra González
 (1853): José María Herrera y Lozada
 (1855): Pánfilo Barasorda
 (1855): Ángel Cabrera Merino
 (1855) - 1856): Francisco Díez Marina

Reform War and the Second Empire to the French Intervention (1857-1867) 

 (1856- 1857) Silvestre Méndez
 (1857): Sabino Flores
 (1857): José María Arteaga
 (1857): Manuel Montes Navarrete
 (1858): José María Arteaga
 (1858): Francisco Berdusco
 (1858): Octaviano Muñoz Ledo
 (1858 - 1859): Tomás Mejía
 (1858): Cayetano Montoya
 (1860: Manuel María Escobar y Rivera
 (1860 - 1862): José María Arteaga
 (1861): Pedro M. Rioseco
 (1860: Silvestre Méndez
 (1862): Silvestre Méndez
 (1862): Zeferino Macías
 (1862): Ignacio Echegaray
 (1862): José Linares
 (1862 - 1863): José María Arteaga
 (1863 -1864): Desiderio de Samaniego
 (1864 -1866): Manuel Gutiérrez de Salceda y Gómez
 (1866): José Antonio Septién y Villaseñor
 (1867): Manuel Domínguez y Quintanar

Restored Republic (1867-1876) 

 (1867 - 1870): Julio M. Cervantes
 (1870): Miguel Eguiluz
 (1870): Margarito Mena
 (1870 - 1872): Julio M. Cervantes
 (1870): Leandro Múzquiz
 (1872): Juan N. Rubio 
 (1872): Julio M. Cervantes
 (1872): José Francisco Bustamante
 (1872): Julio M. Cervantes
 (1872): José Francisco Bustamante
 (1872 - 1873): Ignacio Castro
 (1873 - 1875): Benito Santos Zenea
 (1873 - 1874): Francisco Villaseñor
 (1875): Francisco Villaseñor
 (1875): Luis G. Lanchazo
 (1875 - 1876): Francisco Villaseñor
 (1876): León Covarrubias Acevedo
 (1876): Carlos M. Rubio
 (1876): Francisco A. Vélez 
 (1876): Carlos Castilla
 (1876): Francisco Villaseñor

The Porfiriato (1876-1911) 

 (1876): Francisco A. Vélez
 (1876): Antonio Ruiz (governor)
 (1876 - 1880): Antonio Gayón
 (1877): Luis Castañeda (governor)
 (1879)  José María Rivera Olvera
 (1880): José María Esquivel
 (1880 - 1883): Francisco González de Cosío
 (1883 - 1887): Rafael Olvera Ledesma 
 (1884): Timoteo Fernández de Jáuregui
 (1884): Alfonso M. Veraza
 (1884): Timoteo Fernández de Jáuregui
 (1885): Alfonso M. Veraza
 (1886): Alfonso M. Veraza
 (1886 - 1887): José Vázquez Marroquín
 (1887): José Vázquez Marroquín
 (1887 - 1911): Francisco González de Cosío
 (1887): José Vázquez Marroquín
 (1900): José Vázquez Marroquín
 (1900): José María Esquivel
 (1900 - 1901): José Vázquez Marroquín

The Revolución (1911-1917) 

1911 Adolfo de la Isla
1911 Alfonso M. Veraza
1911 José Antonio Septién
1911 Carlos M. Loyola
1913-1914 Joaquín F. Chicarro
1914 José Antonio Septién
1914 Francisco Murguía
1914 Federico Montes
1914-1915 Teodoro Elizondo
1915 Gustavo M. Bravo
1915 José Siurob Ramírez
1915-1917 Federico Montes
1916-1917 Emilio Salinas

Modern Mexican State (1917-1997) 

1917 Ernesto Perrusquía
1919-1920 Salvador Argain Domínguez
1920 Fernando N. Villarreal
1920 Rómulo de la Torre
1920 José M. Truchuelo
1923 Francisco Ramírez Luque
1923 Fernando Ávalos
1923 Joaquín de la Peña
1924-1925 Julián Malo Juvera
1925 Alfonso Ballesteros Ríos
1925 Agustín Herrera Pérez
1925-1927 Constantino Llaca Nieto
1927 Fernando Díaz Ramírez
1927-1929 Abraham Araujo
1929 José B. Alcocer
1929 Ángel Vázquez Mellado
1929-1931 Ramón Anaya
1931 Antonio Pérez Alcocer
1931-1935 Saturnino Osornio
1935-1939 Ramón Rodríguez Familiar
1939-1943 Noradino Rubio
1943-1949 Agapito Pozo
1949 Eduardo Luque Loyola 
1949-1955 Octavio Mondragón Guerra 
1955-1961 Juan C. Gorraéz 
1961-1967 Manuel González Cosío 
1967-1973 Juventino Castro Sánchez 
1973-1979 Antonio Calzada Urquiza 
1979-1985 Rafael Camacho Guzmán 
1985-1991 Mariano Palacios Alcocer 
1991-1997 Enrique Burgos García

Contemporary Mexican State (1997-present) 

1997-2003 Ignacio Loyola Vera 
2003-2009 Francisco Garrido Patrón 
2009-2015 José Eduardo Calzada Rovirosa 
2015 Jorge López Portillo Tostado, Interim
2015-2021 Francisco Domínguez Servién 
2021-present Mauricio Kuri González

See also
List of Mexican state governors
Politics of Mexico

References

Footnotes

Citations

Queretaro